Thiophosphoryl bromide is an inorganic compound with the formula .

Preparation 
Thiophosphoryl bromide can be prepared by heating phosphorus tribromide with phosphorus pentasulfide, or with elemental sulfur in an inert atmosphere at 130 °C.

Structure and properties 
Thiophosphoryl bromide has tetrahedral molecular geometry and C3v molecular symmetry. According to gas electron diffraction, the phosphorus–sulfur bond length is 1.895 Å and the phosphorus–bromine bond length is 2.193 Å, while the S=P–Br bond angle is 116.2° and the Br–P–Br bond angle is 101.9°.

Thiophosphoryl bromide is soluble in carbon disulfide, chloroform and diethyl ether.

Reactions 
Like other phosphoryl and thiophosphoryl halides, thiophosphoryl bromide readily hydrolyses, undergoes nucleophilic substitution and forms adducts with Lewis acids. Reaction with lithium iodide generates the mixed thiophosphoryl halides  and  but not thiophosphoryl iodide, . Thiophosphoryl bromide is of use in organic synthesis for reducing sulfoxides to thioethers, and sulfines to thioketones.

References 

Thiophosphoryl compounds